The Night of June 13 is a 1932 American pre-Code mystery film directed by Stephen Roberts. The film stars Clive Brook, Frances Dee, Charlie Ruggles, Gene Raymond, Lila Lee, Mary Boland and Adrianne Allen. The film was released on September 23, 1932, by Paramount Pictures.

Cast

Clive Brook as John Curry
Lila Lee as Trudie Morrow
Charlie Ruggles as Philo Strawn
Frances Dee as Ginger Blake
Gene Raymond as Herbert Morrow
Mary Boland as Mazie Strawn
Adrianne Allen as Elna Curry
Charley Grapewin as "Grandpop" Jeptha Strawn
Helen Ware as Mrs. Lizzie Morrow
Helen Jerome Eddy as Martha Blake
Arthur Hohl as Prosecuting Attorney
Billy Butts as Junior Strawn
Richard Carle as Otto

Other uncredited cast members (alphabetically)

Bobby Barber as Jury Foreman 
Frederick Burton as Judge 
Wallis Clark as Defense Attorney 
John Elliott as Real Estate Agent 
Paul Fix as Reporter 
Billy Franey as Jimmy - Trash Collector 
Otto Fries as Bailiff 
Edward LeSaint as Mr. Henry Morrow 
Kent Taylor as Reporter

References

External links 
 

1932 films
American mystery films
1932 mystery films
Paramount Pictures films
Films directed by Stephen Roberts
American black-and-white films
1930s English-language films
1930s American films